West Valley Freeway may refer to:
West Valley Freeway (California), designated State Route 85
West Valley Freeway (Washington), designated State Route 167